The following is a list of managers of Bolton Wanderers Football Club and their major honours from the beginning of the club's official managerial records in 1885 to the present day. As of the 2020–21 season, Bolton Wanderers have had 28 full-time managers with one, Nat Lofthouse, being in charge on two occasions.

The most successful person to manage Bolton Wanderers, to date, is Charles Foweraker, who won three FA Cups in his 25-year reign as manager. He is also the club's longest-serving manager. The current manager is Ian Evatt, appointed in July 2020.

Statistics
Information correct as of matches played up to 17 March 2023. Only competitive matches are counted.

Notes

References

 
Managers
Bolton Wanderers